USS Nodaway may refer to:

, was a gasoline tanker launched in 1945 and eventually acquired by Sun Oil
, was a gasoline tanker launched in 1945 as MV Tarcoola

United States Navy ship names